Henry Turner House and Caldwell–Turner Mill Site is a historic home, grist mill site, and national historic district located at Statesville, Iredell County, North Carolina. The house was built about 1860, and is a two-story, three bay by two bay, frame dwelling with Greek Revival style design elements.  It has a gable roof, exterior end chimneys, rear ell extension, two 12-foot-deep hand-dug cisterns, and a two-story, pedimented front entrance porch.  Also on the property is the site of a grist mill, race, and dam and a family cemetery.

It was listed on the National Register of Historic Places in 1980.

References

Agricultural buildings and structures on the National Register of Historic Places in North Carolina
Farms on the National Register of Historic Places in North Carolina
Historic districts on the National Register of Historic Places in North Carolina
Greek Revival houses in North Carolina
Houses completed in 1860
Houses in Iredell County, North Carolina
National Register of Historic Places in Iredell County, North Carolina